The Holy Kinship is a circa 1495 oil on panel painting of Holy Kinship by the workshop of the renaissance artist Geertgen tot Sint Jans in the collection of the Rijksmuseum.

Painting
The Holy Kinship shows the Virgin and Child in the left center with Saint Elizabeth and John the Baptist slightly more prominently positioned center right. The "kinship" members have been further identified as Saint Anne with a book on the left with her husband Joachim behind her and behind him Saint Joseph holding a lily towards his wife as a gesture of the immaculate conception. Three young cousins of the infants, the later disciples Simon, Jacob and John, pour wine into a chalice in the centre of the painting which is a reference to the Eucharist, and beyond them a sculpture of Abraham's sacrifice of Isaac on the altar represents God's sacrifice of Jesus. A young Judas stands lighting the candles of the choir gate. In the doorways of the choir gate stand the other two former husbands of Saint Anne, the fathers of the other two Marias who are positioned behind St. Elisabeth.

Provenance
This painting is a former altarpiece of an unspecified church, though it is tempting to imagine similarities to the Commanderie van Sint-Jan where Geertgen is known to have lived and worked: Janskerk, Haarlem. The provenance of this painting only goes back to a Brussels sale in 1797 however, and indeed the painting was purchased in 1808 as a work by Jan and Hubert van Eyck. It wasn't until 1888 that it was identified as a work by the Haarlem master. Since then several attempts have been made to determine the origins of the painting. In his translated Schilder-boeck, Hessel Miedema reported that Geertgen died somewhere between 1486 and 1492, while recent dendrochronology, on the other hand, places the painting around 1496 at the earliest. The painting has many similar details in common with Albert van Ouwater's circa 1445 Lazarus and the tiled floor is similar to a contemporary painting by the Master of Alkmaar:

Exhibitions

This painting has been considered a highlight of the collection since it was bought in 1808 and has been included in all Highlights of the Rijksmuseum catalogs. It was the subject of a mini-exhibition after 17 years were spent 1983-2000 restoring 12 centimeters of water damage at the bottom of the painting.

References

 SK-A-500 painting record on museum website

15th-century paintings
Paintings in the collection of the Rijksmuseum
Paintings by Geertgen tot Sint Jans
Paintings of the Madonna and Child
Paintings depicting John the Baptist
tot Sint Jans
Books in art
Paintings of children
Churches in art
Paintings of Elizabeth (biblical figure)
Altarpieces